Danny Preda (born 1 April 1987) is an Israeli footballer who currently plays as a midfielder for Hapoel Mahane Yehuda in the Liga Alef.

External links
 Profile page at Israel Football Association
 Profile page at ONE

1987 births
Living people
Footballers from Petah Tikva
Israeli footballers
Association football midfielders
Maccabi Petah Tikva F.C. players
Beitar Jerusalem F.C. players
Hapoel Bnei Lod F.C. players
Maccabi Herzliya F.C. players
F.C. Kafr Qasim players
Hapoel Mahane Yehuda F.C. players
Israeli Premier League players
Liga Leumit players
Jewish Israeli sportspeople
Jewish footballers
Israeli people of Ethiopian-Jewish descent
Sportspeople of Ethiopian descent